Lt. Gen. János Kamara (1 May 1927 – 3 July 2000) was a Hungarian communist politician, who served as Interior Minister between 1985 and 1987.

References

 Rulers.org

1927 births
2000 deaths
Hungarian communists
Hungarian Interior Ministers